Rohrs is an unincorporated community in Nemaha County, Nebraska, United States.

History
A post office was established at Rohrs in 1917, and remained in operation until it was discontinued in 1944.

Rohrs was a station and trading point on the Missouri Pacific Railroad.

References

Unincorporated communities in Nemaha County, Nebraska
Unincorporated communities in Nebraska